Eve Harlow (born ) is a Canadian-Israeli actress. She is known for her roles on television, including as Maya in the CW series The 100 (2014–2015), as Taylor in the NBC miniseries Heroes Reborn (2015), and as Tess in the ABC series Agents of S.H.I.E.L.D. (2017–2018). She won a Leo Award and received a Gemini Award nomination for her portrayal of Tina Renwald in The Guard (2008–2009).

Early life 
Harlow was born in Moscow, Russian SFSR, Soviet Union, to a family of Soviet Jewish, Mongolian, and Middle Eastern descent. As a three month old baby, her family immigrated with Harlow to Israel where she grew up. They relocated to Vancouver, British Columbia, Canada seven years later.

Career
Beginning in 2007, Harlow began to play small roles in various short films, feature films, and television series; the first role she booked was a small part in the Academy Award-winning film Juno (2007).

In 2008, Harlow was cast as Tina Renwald in a Canadian television series The Guard. For this role, Harlow won a Leo Award for Best Supporting Performance by a Female in a Dramatic Series in 2009, and was nominated for a Gemini Award in 2010. Following this, she continued to work steadily on screen, appearing in films, such as The Tall Man (2012), and television series, including Flashpoint (2011) and Cracked (2013), among others.

In 2012, she played a lead role in the short film When You Sleep, directed by Ashley McKenzie, which won several awards and screened at film festivals around the world, most notably at the Cannes Film Festival.

In 2014, Harlow played guest roles in several television shows, including Fargo, Bitten, The Killing, and Lost Girl. That year, she was also cast as Maya Vie in the second season of The CW show The 100. In 2015, Harlow portrayed Taylor Kravid in the NBC miniseries Heroes Reborn, based on the original series, and also appeared in the Lifetime series UnREAL as Bethany, the roommate of the main character Rachel Goldberg, portrayed by Shiri Appleby.

In 2017, Harlow was cast as Tess, a recurring character in the 5th season of Agents of S.H.I.E.L.D., and as Melody in the pilot for the forthcoming legal drama The Jury.

Filmography

Film

Television

Accolades

References

External links 

 

21st-century Canadian actresses
Canadian film actresses
Canadian television actresses
Canadian people of Jewish descent
Canadian people of Middle Eastern descent
Living people
1989 births
Soviet emigrants to Israel
Israeli emigrants to Canada